Leander Haußmann (sometimes Haussmann) (born 26 June 1959, Quedlinburg) is a German theatre and film director.

The son of actor Ezard Haußmann and costume designer Doris Haußmann, he attended the Ernst Busch theatre school in Berlin.

Haußmann was the theatre director of the city theatre in Bochum (Schauspielhaus Bochum). He also wrote and acted in several plays (1995–2000), and had a role in the Detlev Buck film Jailbirds (1996). His feature film breakthrough came with Sonnenallee in 1999. His second feature, Herr Lehmann, followed in 2003. His production of Die Fledermaus in Munich was controversial, compounding the trouble surrounding his production of Peter Pan. As a result, his scheduled production of Romeo and Juliet was cancelled.

Filmography
 Sonnenallee, with Detlev Buck, Robert Stadlober, Alexander Beyer (1999)
  – Die Durchmacher (2001, TV documentary series episode)
 Berlin Blues (2003)
 NVA, with Detlev Buck, Kim Alexander Frank, Jasmin Schwiers (2005)
 , with Götz George, Katharina Thalbach, August Diehl (2005, TV film)
 Why Men Don't Listen and Women Can't Read Maps, with Benno Fürmann, Jessica Schwarz, Uwe Ochsenknecht (2007)
 Robert Zimmermann Is Tangled Up in Love (2008)
  (2009)
 Hotel Lux (2011)
  (2017)

References

External links

Leander Haußmann at Filmportal.de

1959 births
Living people
Film directors from Saxony-Anhalt
People from Quedlinburg
Ernst Busch Academy of Dramatic Arts alumni